"The Warmth of the Sun" is a song written by Brian Wilson and Mike Love for the American rock band The Beach Boys. It was released on their 1964 album Shut Down Volume 2 and as the B-side of the "Dance, Dance, Dance" single, which charted at number eight in the United States and number twenty four in the United Kingdom. Brian Wilson produced the song, and the rest of the album.

Information
Wilson and Love began composing the song on  November 22, 1963, the day of the assassination of John F. Kennedy, although the two co-authors give different accounts of the timing and whether it was begun before or after the killing. The subsequent recording of the song was informed by the emotional shock felt by its authors in the wake of Kennedy's death.

In the 2016 autobiography I Am Brian Wilson, Wilson recalled that the song was written the day of the assassination, in response to it:

Cash Box described it as "an ultra-lovely, lazy paced ballad that the boys deliver in oh-so -smooth, ear-arresting fashion."  Reviewing the song for AllMusic, Donald A. Guarisco stated, "The sublime balance of lush vocals and sensitive songwriting made 'The Warmth of the Sun' one of the Beach Boys' finest and most moving ballads."  Brian Wilson pioneered the use of adventurous chord changes in pop—"The Warmth of the Sun"'s transitions from C to A-minor to E-flat, were unheard of in 1964.

Among the session musicians who played on the recording were Hal Blaine and Ray Pohlman.

Personnel 
Credits from Craig Slowinski.

The Beach Boys

 Al Jardine – backing vocals, rhythm guitar
 Mike Love – backing vocals
 Brian Wilson – lead vocals, backing vocals, piano
 Carl Wilson – backing vocals, lead guitar (with tremolo)
 Dennis Wilson – backing vocals, drums

Additional musicians

 Ray Pohlman – bass guitar
 Hal Blaine – bell tree, clinking percussion
 Steve Douglas – tenor saxophone
 Jay Migliori – baritone saxophone

Appearances

It was featured on the soundtrack of Good Morning, Vietnam (1987).

Willie Nelson performed lead vocals on a version of the song on the album Stars and Stripes Vol. 1.

Other versions
The song was recorded by Murry Wilson—father of Brian, Carl and Dennis Wilson—on his one and only album, The Many Moods of Murry Wilson, which was released in 1967 on Capitol Records.

Vince Gill performed another version at "An All-Star Tribute to Brian Wilson (2001)" concert.

In 2006, Matthew Sweet and Bangles lead singer Susanna Hoffs recorded the song for their collaboration, Under the Covers, Vol. 1.

In 2006, Matt Thiessen of Relient K released a version of the song for his solo piano project Matt Thiessen & The Earthquakes via the compilation album My Other Band, Vol 1.

In 2010, Rumer recorded a version on the B-side of her single "Aretha".

Shelby Flint and Tim Weston, "Wouldn't It Be Nice, A Jazz Portrait of Brian Wilson."

Friends of Dean Martinez recorded a version on their album "Under the Waves."

References

1960s ballads
1964 songs
The Beach Boys songs
Brian Wilson songs
Matthew Sweet songs
Songs written by Brian Wilson
Songs written by Mike Love
Song recordings produced by Brian Wilson
Songs about the assassination of John F. Kennedy